Nesopupa turtoni is a species of very small, air-breathing land snail, a terrestrial pulmonate gastropod mollusk in the family Vertiginidae, the whorl snails. This species is Endemic to Saint Helena island; it was thought to be extinct until its rediscovery in 2003.

The shell of this species is up to 2.5 mm long and 1.2 mm wide, with a short, stout, sub-cylindrical shell and a squarish aperture.

References

Vertiginidae
Gastropods described in 1892

Taxonomy articles created by Polbot